Courbis is a French surname. Notable people with the surname include:

Jean-Antoine Courbis (1752–1795), French lawyer and revolutionary
Paul Courbis, (born 1967), French programmer
Rolland Courbis, (born 1953), French footballer and manager

French-language surnames